The lumbar trunks are formed by the union of the efferent vessels from the lateral aortic lymph nodes.

They receive the lymph from the lower limbs, from the walls and viscera of the pelvis, from the kidneys and suprarenal glands and the deep lymphatics of the greater part of the abdominal wall.

Ultimately, the lumbar trunks empty into the cisterna chyli, a dilatation at the beginning of the thoracic duct.

References

External links
 Overview at uams.edu

Lymphatics of the torso